The Light of Day is a 1962 novel by Eric Ambler.

Plot
Arthur Abdel Simpson, the narrator, is an amoral taxi-driver and petty-criminal in Athens, who gets his living mostly by ripping off tourists. One of his targets, a man named Harper, catches him, and blackmails him into driving a car across the border from Greece into Turkey. The Turkish authorities find that the car is loaded with concealed illegal weapons, and Simpson faces the terrifying prospect of a long term in a Turkish prison.  However, the authorities offer him a chance to earn leniency: he must deliver the weapons according to Harper's instructions, and then somehow ingratiate himself with Harper's gang, learn their goals and plans, and report regularly to the government's agents. The government suspects an attempt at terrorism or insurgency, but it turns out that Harper and his gang actually have an audacious plan to steal valuable gems from the treasury museum of the Topkapı Palace.  While preparing for the robbery, one of the gang suffers a disabling injury, and Simpson is forced to take his place and participate in the commando-type raid on the museum, despite having no relevant experience whatsoever.

Reception

Kirkus Reviews described it as "an impeccable international intrigue... this is a suave, scapegrace and often very funny entertainment." A review on Reaction.life described it as "a psychological sketch of brutal acuity, wrapped in a comic masterpiece."

It was nominated for the 1962 Gold Dagger award. It won the Mystery Writers of America's Edgar Allan Poe Award for best novel in 1964.

It was filmed in 1964 as Topkapi. This was the most successful adaptation of one of Ambler's books.

References

English thriller novels
Novels by Eric Ambler
1962 British novels